Honeyland is a 1935 American one-reel animated film in the Happy Harmonies series, directed by Rudolf Ising for the Metro-Goldwyn-Mayer cartoon studio. This is the studio's second cartoon in three-strip Technicolor. The short is based on the song, sung by the vaudevillian trio, the Brox Sisters.

Plot
Bees are harvesting nectar from flowers to make honey, as the camera turns to a trio of singing bees. They perform the song as bees are shown making honey, using ways like human techniques of farming, a stereotypical "French chef" tasting it, and melting candle wax to preserve, a reference to beeswax.

Two bees are shown chasing each other, outside the safety of the hive. Then, the antagonist (a spider) comes in and chases and captures the female bee. The male bee tries to fight the spider, and the female escapes. Using a flower as a rotary telephone, she contacts the operator, telling him to call for all bees. They come into formation, as the spider tries to escape. To a part of Rimsky-Korsakov's Flight of the Bumblebee, the group continually stung the spider's abdomen, and the spider runs off. The female bee goes to aid the male bee, and with a kiss, he is happy, and all the bees cheer.

References

External links
 

Metro-Goldwyn-Mayer animated short films
1935 films
1930s American animated films
Films scored by Scott Bradley
1935 animated films
Happy Harmonies
Films directed by Rudolf Ising